A baseline, as defined by the United Nations Convention on the Law of the Sea, is the line along the coast from which the seaward limits of a state's territorial sea and certain other maritime zones of jurisdiction are measured, such as a state's exclusive economic zone. Normally, a sea baseline follows the low-water line of a coastal state. When the coast is deeply indented, has fringing islands or is highly unstable, straight baselines may be used.

Measurement of baseline

The following methods are used to measure a baseline under United Nations Convention on the Law of the Sea 1982.

Normal baseline
Except where otherwise provided in this Convention, the normal baseline for measuring the breadth of the territorial sea is the low-water line along the coast as marked on large-scale charts officially recognized by the coastal State.

Reefs
In the case of islands situated on atolls or of islands having fringing reefs,  the  baseline  for  measuring  the  breadth  of  the territorial  sea  is  the seaward low-water line of the reef, as shown by the appropriate symbol on charts officially recognized by the coastal State.

Straight baselines
 In localities where the coastline is deeply indented and cut into, or if there is a fringe of islands along the coast in its immediate vicinity, the method of straight baselines joining appropriate points may be employed in drawing the baseline from which the breadth of the territorial sea is measured.
 Where  the  method  of  straight  baselines  is  applicable  under paragraph 1, account may be taken, in determining particular baselines, of economic  interests  peculiar  to  the  region  concerned,  the  reality  and  the importance of which are clearly evidenced by long usage.
 The system of straight baselines may not be applied by a State in such a manner as to cut off the territorial sea of another State from the high seas or an exclusive economic zone.

See also
 Territorial waters
 Exclusive economic zone
 Continental shelf
 International waters
 United Nations Convention on the Law of the Sea

Notes

References

 United Nations Convention on the Law of the Sea (UNCLOS) – Part II

Hydrography
Law of the sea